Carlos Lorenzo Fischer Brusoni (1903 – 7 August 1969) was a Uruguayan political figure. He was President of Uruguay from 1958 to 1959, at the end of a long period of rule by Presidents of the Colorado Party not to be resumed by that party until 1967.

Background
Fischer was a member of the Uruguayan Colorado Party. From February 15, 1943, until November 9, 1949, during the 34th and 35th legislative period he was, representing the department Río Negro, a member of the Cámara de Representantes. In the early 1950s he was minister of agriculture in Uruguay.

In 1955 he was elected member of the National Council of Government; after his fellow-Colorado colleague Arturo Lezama stepped down as President of the body, on March 7, 1958, he acceded to that position. At March 1, 1959 The next year he was succeeded by Martín Echegoyen of the National Party, after which Fischer was until 1963 the first vice-president in the Senate of Uruguay.

During the 38th and 39th legislative period he was a replacing senator from March 3, 1959, with some interruptions until February 14, 1967.

See also
 Politics of Uruguay
 Colorado Party (Uruguay)

References

Presidents of the National Council of Government (Uruguay)
Uruguayan people of German descent
Fischer
1903 births
1969 deaths